The National Prize for Literature (Spanish: Premio Nacional de Literatura) is a literary award made annually to Venezuelan writers.

 1948 Mario Briceño Iragorry (El Regente Heredia o la piedad heroica)
 1949 Carlos Augusto León (A solas con la vida)
 1950 Santiago Key Ayala (Bajo el signo del Avila)
 1951 Juan Liscano (Humano destino)
 1952 Ramón Díaz Sánchez (Guzmán: elipse de una ambición de poder)
 1953 Félix Armando Núñez (El poema de la tarde)
 1954 Mariano Picón Salas (Los días de Cipriano Castro)
 1954 Arturo Uslar Pietri (Las nubes)
 1955 Manuel Felipe Rugeles (Cantos de sur y norte)
 1956 Miguel Otero Silva (Casas Muertas)
 1956 Augusto Mijares (La luz y el espejo)
 1957 Juan Beroes (Poemas itálicos : materia de eternidad)
 1958 Rómulo Gallegos (La doncella)
 1959 Juan Manuel González (La heredad junto al viento)
 1960 José Fabbiani Ruiz (A orillas del sueño)
 1961 José Ramón Medina (Memorias y elegías)
 1962 José Antonio de Armas Chitty (Tucupido, Formación de un Pueblo del Llano)
 1963 Luis Pastori (Elegía sin fin)
 1964 Arturo Croce (El espacio en el tiempo)
 1965 José Tadeo Arreaza Calatrava (category: poetry. Poesía)
 1966 Alberto Arvelo Torrealba (Lazo Martí: vigencia en lejanía)
 1967 Fernando Paz Castillo (Poesía)
 1968 Guillermo Meneses (Espejos y disfraces)
 1969 Vicente Gerbasi (Poesía de viajes)
 1970 Alfredo Armas Alfonzo (El osario de Dios)
 1970 Luis Beltrán Guerrero (El tema de la revolución)
 1971 Pablo Rojas Guardia (La voz inacabada)
 1972 Alfredo Boulton (Historia de la pintura en Venezuela)
 1972 Salvador Garmendia (Los escondites)
 1973 
 Caupolicán Ovalles (category: poetry. Copa de huesos)
 Jose Luis Salcedo Bastardo (Bolívar: un continente y un destino)
 Ramón José Velásquez (prose category, for La caída del liberalismo amarillo
 1974 José Ramón Heredia (category: poetry. Antología poética)
 1974 Pedro Pablo Barnola Duxans (category: essay. Afirmaciones de cultura)
 1974 Julio Garmendia (lifetime achievement)
 1975 Orlando Araujo (category: essay. Contrapunteo de la vida y de la muerte: ensayo sobre la poesía de Alberto Arvelo Torrealba)
 1975 Ramón Palomares (Adios Escuque)
 1976 Antonia Palacios (El largo día ya seguro)
 1976 Juan Sánchez Peláez (category: poetry. Rasgos comunes)
 1976 Guillermo Sucre (category: essay. La máscara, la transparencia)
 1977 Ida Gramcko (category: poetry)
 1978 Juan David García Bacca (lifetime achievement)
 1978 Luis Alberto Crespo (category: poetry. Costumbre de Sequía)
 1979 Francisco Pérez Perdomo (lifetime achievement)
 1980 Adriano González León (lifetime achievement)
 1981 Miguel Ramón Utrera
 1982 Arturo Uslar Pietri (La isla de Robinson)
 1983 Pascual Venegas Filardo
 1984 Isaac J Pardo (essay: Fuegos bajo el agua)
 1985 Rafael Cadenas (lifetime achievement)
 1986 Luz Machado (lifetime achievement)
 1987 Rafael Ángel Díaz Sosa (lifetime achievement)
 1989 Ana Enriqueta Terán (lifetime achievement)
 1990 Guillermo Morón (lifetime achievement)
 1991 José Balza (lifetime achievement)
 1992 Pedro Pablo Paredes (lifetime achievement)
 1993 Pedro Grases (lifetime achievement)
 1994 Elizabeth Schön (lifetime achievement)
 1998 Eugenio Montejo (lifetime achievement)
 1999 Elisa Lerner (lifetime achievement)
 2000 Gustavo Pereira (lifetime achievement)
 2001 Luis Britto García (lifetime achievement)
 2003 Carlos Noguera (lifetime achievement)
 2006 Renato Rodríguez (lifetime achievement)
 2008 William Osuna (lifetime achievement)
 2010 Luis Albero Crespo (lifetime achievement)
 2012 Francisco Massiani (lifetime achievement)

See also 
List of literary awards
Literature of Venezuela

Venezuelan literary awards
Spanish-language literary awards
Awards established in 1948